The Samoa women's national under-17 football team is the second highest women's youth team of women's football in Samoa and is controlled by the Football Federation Samoa, the governing body for football in Samoa. Samoa's home ground is the National Soccer Stadium (Samoa) in Apia. It was known as the Western Samoa national football team until 1997. Samoa is a part of the FIFA Goal project.

History
Samoa participated for the first time in the OFC U-17 Women's Championship in 2016. It wasn't a huge success as the team suffered three heavy defeats. However, they managed to score a goal by Sophia Aveau against Tonga. The game ended in a 4–1 defeat but Samoa's first and only goal so far was scored.

OFC
The OFC Women's Under 17 Qualifying Tournament is a tournament held once every two years to decide the only qualification spot for Oceania Football Confederation (OFC) and representatives at the FIFA U-17 World Cup.

Current technical staff

Current squad
The following players were called up for the 2017 OFC U-16 Women's Championship

Caps and goals correct after match against New Zealand on August 12, 2017.

References

External links
Samoa Football Federation page
Oceania Football Federation page

Football in Samoa
Women's national under-17 association football teams
U